Club Atlético Independiente is an Argentine professional sports club, which has its headquarters and stadium in the city of Avellaneda in Greater Buenos Aires. The club is best known for its football team, which plays in the Primera División and is considered one of Argentina's Big Five football clubs.

Independiente was officially founded on 1 January 1905, although the institution had been formed on 4 August 1904. Originally from Monserrat, a neighbourhood of Buenos Aires, the club moved to Avellaneda in 1907. The football team has won 16 Primera División titles (the last one was the 2002 Apertura) and 9 National cups.

In international club football competitions, Independiente has won a total of 21 titles, with 18 of them organised by CONMEBOL and other associations. Independiente's achievements include a record of seven Copa Libertadores won, being the only club to win four finals in a row, between 1972 and 1975. The club has won the Copa Interamericana three times, the Supercopa Sudamericana twice, the Recopa Sudamericana once, the Intercontinental Cup twice (1973 and 1984), and the Copa Sudamericana twice, in 2010 and 2017. The 2018 Suruga Bank Championship was its most recent achievement.

These achievements led the team to adopt the nickname of Rey de Copas (King of Cups) after they conquered its 12th international title, the first team in the world to do so, in reference to the Spanish playing cards' highest number. After winning the 1984 Intercontinental Cup against Liverpool F.C. in Japan, Independiente won the first confrontation involving Argentine and British teams after the Falklands War, a triumph that was celebrated by all Argentines and gave the team the motto of Orgullo Nacional (National Pride).

Apart from football, other activities practised at the club are athletics, basketball, boxing, chess, field hockey, futsal, handball, gymnastics, martial arts, Pilates, roller skating, scuba diving, swimming, tennis, volleyball, water polo, and yoga.
Also, the club has its own school, with Pre-Kindergarten, Kindergarten, Elementary and Secondary school levels.

History

Foundation

Roots to the creation of Club Atlético Independiente can be traced to 4 August 1904, when a group of employees from a shoes store located in Buenos Aires founded a football club called "Maipú-Banfield FC". The mostly young employees were only allowed to watch the games; they could not play for the team. As a result, at a meeting in a bar located in front of the club, they chose to form a new club. The name chosen was "Independiente" to mark their independence from Maipú FC.

Rosendo Degiorgi was appointed interim president. Degiorgi's family offered the use of a small room in their home to serve as the first club headquarters. It was established the Sunday 1 January 1905 as the official foundation date. Arístides Langone was elected first president of the institution, and it was proposed by him to adopt white with details in blue as the club's colors, inspired by team St. Andrew's, the first champions of football in Argentina winners of 1891 season.

Independiente played the first game on his history on Sunday 15 January 1905, against Atlanta, in the "bohemios" field, losing 1–0. The next game was played on 22 January 1905 against Maipú Banfield F.C., which ended in a 0–0 draw. The club won the first game in its history with a resounding 11–0 win against Albion on 7 May 1905. Independiente then got affiliated to The Argentine Football Association, and was allowed to play in the second and third divisions. The first "Avellaneda derby" was played on 9 June 1907. Independiente beat Racing 3–2.

That same year Independiente moved from Buenos Aires to its new field located in Avellaneda city, which was built in Manuel Ocantos street.

On 10 May 1908, the team played for the first time wearing the red jersey, in a match against Banfield that Independiente won 9–2. The adoption of the red color is subject to controversy; the most recognized version is the one by decision of president Arístides Langone, who became surprised watching English team Nottingham Forest in a tour winning by a trashing 6–0 against Alumni AC, the strongest Argentine club on that era, so he decided to adopt the Forest's colors.

In 1909, the Independiente F.C. won its first trophy; the 1909 Copa Bullrich, a domestic cup for second tier teams. Goalkeeper José Buruca Laforia was one of the first star players on Independiente.

Promotion to Primera División 

Independiente moved to a new stadium in the Crucecita district of Avellaneda, known as Estadio Crucecita in 1911. It would be their venue until 1928 when the owner of the land refused to sell it to the club. Independiente was promoted to the top division of Argentine football, Primera División, in 1911, along with Argentino de Quilmes, Atlanta, and Kimberley.

The team debuted in 1912. Since there were a conflict between some clubs, the football league was dividided into two leagues with their own separate federation (AAF and FAF), and only a few teams remained in FAF, so the federation invited Independiente, among other teams.

With politician and club president Juan Mignaburu as head coach, the team finished in first place along with CA Porteño at 20 points. Goal difference wasn't used and the teams had to play a playoff match, with Porteño winning the championship as a result of Independiente abandoning the match in protest at a disallowed goal by referee. League's top scorer was Independiente striker Enrique Colla, with 12 goals.

At the 1910s, the Avellaneda derby between Independiente and Racing Club de Avellaneda was the most popular confrontation, ahead of the "Superclásico" between River Plate and Boca Juniors.

Although being one of the most popular teams, Independiente did not win any league on that decade. They instead won some domestic first division trophies; 1914 Copa de Competencia La Nación (awarded), 1917 Copa de Competencia Jockey Club (defeating Estudiantes de La Plata, 2–1) and the 1918 Copa de Honor (beating CA Platense, 1–0).

With the obtention of cup titles, Independiente qualified for the first time to rioplatense competitions (international titles between Argentine and Uruguayan teams), both resulting in defeat; 1917 Tie Cup (to Montevideo Wanderers, 0–4) and 1918 Copa de Honor Cousenier (to Peñarol, 0–4).

In early the 1920s Independiente won its first league title, the 1922 AAmF Primera División whereas football in Argentina was still split in two separated leagues. Next league title was the 1926 AAmF Primera División season. Both championships featured Manuel Seoane as top scorer, giving Independiente a lot of power in attack along with Luis Ravaschino and future Italian world champion Raimundo Orsi.

Due to Independiente's powerful attack, media gave the nickname Diablos Rojos (Red Devils) to the team, which quickly became popular among fans and remained identifying the team since then. The club also won consecutively the 1922, 1923 and 1924 editions of the AAmF Copa de Competencia, beating Club Almagro, Sportivo Palermo and CA Lanús respectively at the finals.

In 1923 the Rojos for the first time faced a European team, with Scottish team Third Lanark touring in Argentina. The Argentines won by 2–1 with two goals from Orsi. Later in 1928 the red team defeated a less wealthy FC Barcelona by 4–1,  and one year after, touring team Chelsea FC visited Independiente resulting in a 1–1 tie, with Seoane scoring for el Rojo.

After the 1927 season, Raimundo Orsi left and joined Juventus F.C. Later in 1928 the club built the Estadio Doble Visera, the first stadium in Latin America made entirely of cement, and second in the world after the Harvard Stadium. Formerly, football stadiums in Latin America consisted simply on tribunes and seats made of wooden planks.

1930s

1931 was the Argentine Primera División's first season as a fully professional league. In the early 30s, Independiente finished as runners-up in 1932, 1934, 1935 and 1937.

Manuel Seoane retired in 1933, having become the Argentine Primera División's amateur era top scorer, with 241 goals in 264 matches.

In the next years Vicente de la Mata, Arsenio Erico and Antonio Sastre arrived to the club.
Arsenio Erico was a young Paraguayan who came to Argentina to avoid fighting at the Chaco War for his country. Erico was originally going to be one of those fighting on the Paraguayan side, but he was saved from the clutches of war by Commander Molinas, who  recognized his footballing talent and sent him to the Paraguayan Red Cross football team. The team was set up to raise funds for the soldiers on the battlefront by playing a series of exhibition games against other sides from South America. Erico’s performances caught the eye of some of the bigger clubs they played against, especially those from Argentina. River Plate, Boca Juniors and Independiente were all interested in him. River made the first move, but Independiente swooped in at the last minute, offering the youngster double the money. Erico donated the signing-on fee to the Paraguayan Red Cross, which was more than what they had made from their time on the road. Then he became the Argentine Primera División's top scorer on three consecutive seasons – 1937, 1938 and 1939 – while Antonio Sastre was considered the best footballer in Argentina's history on that times.

The team won the 1938 Primera División and 1939 Primera División seasons, three domestic cups (one Copa Adrián C. Escobar in 1938, and two Copa Ibarguren in 1938 and 1939), and its first two international titles; the Copa Ricardo Aldao on its 1938 and 1939 seasons, defeating Peñarol (3–1 in Montevideo) and Nacional de Montevideo (5–0 in Buenos Aires) respectively.

The 1940s and 1950s
Independiente achieved several overwhelming victories in early the 1940s, including an 8–1 win over Estudiantes de La Plata, 7–1 over Boca Juniors and 7–0 over Racing Club, which are still to this days, the worst defeat on those teams' history. In 1945 it was Independiente' turn to suffer its biggest defeat; 0–8 to CA Vélez Sarsfield.

Although having a lethal offensive, Independiente were crowned champions nine years later, at the 1948 Primera División season, with former team's goalkeeper Fernando Bello as head coach

In 1946, goal scorer Arsenio Erico left the club after 325 official matches and 295 goals, having become in Argentine Primera División and Independiente's all-time top scorer. Antonio Sastre left in 1942 and Vicente de la Mata remained till 1950, winning the 1948 championship.

Independiente did not win any trophy in the 1950s. This is the only decade in the club's history to not win any title. Its best position was 2nd place in 1954. In 1953 the Rojos won 6–0 on a friendly match against Real Madrid on a European tour, with star player Alfredo Di Stefano playing for the Spanish team. The tour also included victories against Valencia CF (3–0), Atlético de Madrid (5–3), Benfica (2–1) and Sporting CP (8–1).

In 1958, Independiente inspired Ecuadorian team Independiente del Valle's founders to adopt the Argentine team's name. Initially, the forementioned team also featured the same colors and a similar emblem. They now compete regularly at the Ecuadorian Serie A.

1960s to 1980s: success at continental and world stages
Independiente won three league titles at the 60s decade; 1960, 1963 and 1967. However, at the time of this last one, Independiente was already making his first steps towards South American glory.

After the 1960 title, the team participated for the first time at a continental championship with its participation at the 1961 Copa Libertadores, losing both quarter-finals legs against SE Palmeiras.

The team won their first continental title by defeating Uruguayan club Nacional at the 1964 Copa Libertadores Finals after a scoreless draw in Montevideo and a 1–0 win at home, having previously disqualified title holders Santos which featured several Brazilian world champion players like Pelé, becoming the first Argentine team to win the competition.

They would also win the 1965 Copa Libertadores, this time after defeating Boca Juniors at semi-finals and Uruguay's other big team, Peñarol (4–1 at neutral match held in Estadio Nacional de Chile).

Being the CONMEBOL champions, Independiente contested twice the Intercontinental Cup but lost both to Italian powerhouse Inter Milan. After a win for each other, the teams played a third match play-off in Santiago Bernabeu Stadium in Spain to decide the 1964 title, with Internazionale winning in extra time with a goal from Mario Corso. For the 1965 edition, Inter won 3–0 on aggregate.

Again, Independiente started a new decade by winning two league titles in a row; 1970, 1971 and, later in the same decade, the 1977 and 1978 editions of the National Championship. The 1977 title is especially remembered by the club as an historic triumph, as the team managed to win the finals against Talleres de Córdoba with a goal from Ricardo Bochini, assisted by Daniel Bertoni, after suffering three players being polemically sent off by the referee. The 1978 title came after a 2–0 win against River Plate in the finals.

Independiente's greatest achievements in the 1970s were conquering the premier continental competition again, and this time with a record four times in a row. In fact, the Diablos Rojos won the 1972 Copa Libertadores defeating Universitario of Peru, the 1973 Copa Libertadores after a third playoff match in Estadio Centenario against Colo-Colo, 1974 Copa Libertadores after another playoff match held in Santiago de Chile against Brazil's São Paulo FC, and 1975 Copa Libertadores against Unión Española. After the 1973 title, Independiente became the team with most Libertadores titles.

Success at the Intercontinental Cup was short. The 1972 edition resulted in loss against AFC Ajax Amsterdam and the 1974 one went to Atlético de Madrid's showcases. However the Argentine side managed to win the 1973 Intercontinental Cup against Juventus F.C., on a single match held at Stadio Olimpico in Rome, where Ricardo Bochini scored to give Independiente a 1–0 win. Another edition was to be contested with FC Bayern Munich in 1975 but it was never played.

The club also obtained three times in a row the Interamerican Cup; in 1973, 1974 and 1976 defeating Club Deportivo Olimpia, CSD Municipal and Atlético Español respectively, going through the penalty shootout in 1974 and 1976.

At the 80s Independiente won the 1983 Torneo Metropolitano after a 2–0 away victory against city archirrivals Racing Club de Avellaneda, who suffered relegation to Primera B division as well, resulting in another historic moment for the team and his supporters. Later on, Independiente won the 1988–89 Primera División season.

The 1983 domestic title served as qualifying for the 1984 Copa Libertadores. Independiente advanced to second stage after tying with Club Olimpia at 9 points, whereas the Rojos had a better goal difference than the Paraguayans. Again, the team advanced as Nacional de Montevideo and CD Universidad Católica where both defeated and Independiente went to a new continental final match. Jorge Burruchaga scored to settle a 1–0 away win against Brazilian side Grêmio and, after a scoreless draw at Avellaneda, Independiente won his seventh Copa Libertadores title.

The season ended successfully after a 1–0 win against Liverpool F.C. at Tokyo National Stadium in Japan to win the 1984 Intercontinental Cup and claim their second world title. Goal was scored by José Alberto Percudani at the first half.

Independiente reached the 1989 Supercopa Sudamericana Finals, having beaten Santos FC, Atlético Nacional and Argentinos Juniors. But no goals where scored in the two legs against compatriots Boca Juniors and the red team lost on penalty shootout.

The 1990s and 2000s titles

The 90s started with the retirement of Ricardo Bochini in 1991. A one club man, in his 20 years of professional football from 1972 to 1991 Bochini played only for Independiente (apart from the Argentina national football team), and participated in the club's Golden Era, with 8 international titles, and 4 Argentine championships. He played a total of 740 matches, scoring 107 goals.

Independiente would then win the 1994 Clausura at national level, while in the next semester, the team won the 1994 Supercopa Libertadores, starting at the round of 16 and beating consecutively the Brazilian teams Santos FC, Grêmio and Cruzeiro EC. Like in 1989, the finals were contested by Argentina's two international-experienced football teams, Independiente and Boca Juniors, with Independiente winning the title with a 1–1 draw in La Bombonera and a 1–0 win at home with a goal by Sebastián Rambert.

With its new international triumph, Independiente contested and won the 1995 Recopa Sudamericana against Copa Libertadores winners Vélez Sarsfield in a single match held in Tokyo, Japan, thanks to a single goal by José Serrizuela.

A new international title came into Independiente's showcases as they managed to defend the title at the 1995 Supercopa Libertadores after a 2–1 aggregate score over Brazil's Flamengo, becoming the first foreign team to be crowned at the Maracanã Stadium. The club now had reached 15 international trophies. However, this time failed to repeat the Japanese held Recopa and lost the 1996 Recopa Sudamericana by 1–4 to Grêmio at the Kobe Universiade Memorial Stadium.

In Argentine summer 2002, Uruguayan striker Diego Forlán was signed by Manchester United for £7.5 million and the result was loss of practically all attack power. Independiente for the first time finished last at the Argentine league at the 2002 Clausura, scoring 14 goals in 19 games.

However the next semester the team achieved their next title by being crowned champions of the 2002 Apertura. This team is very well remembered because of its offensive trident composed by Andrés Silvera, Federico Insúa and Daniel Montenegro, three players with some future at the national team, while being defended by Gabriel Milito.

In 2006 the club sold its young star Sergio Agüero to Atlético de Madrid with a transfer fee of $28 million, becoming Argentina's biggest sale up to this days. Kun made his senior team debut against San Lorenzo in 2003 with only 15 years and one month, what made him the youngest player to ever debut in the Argentinean league. With other remarkable players being sold to European teams like Oscar Ustari and Germán Denis, president Julio Comparada announced the building of new and modern Estadio Libertadores de América, whose construction was finished in 2016 due to various debts and financial problems.

Relegation and comeback

After 15 years without winning an international title, Independiente once again returned to South American elite by being crowned champions of the 2010 Copa Sudamericana, beating Brazilian side Goiás EC at the penalty shootout in the finals, with Independiente hosting the second leg. Oddly enough, the Brazilian team reached the finals after being relegated to Série B in the Brazilian championship, and Independiente had finished at the bottom of the Argentinian league.

The following year, Independiente lost the 2011 Recopa Sudamericana to Brazilian team SC Internacional after a 2–3 aggregate.

When Independiente's president, Julio Comparada, was replaced with Javier Cantero, the latter revealed severe economic problems that could bring Independiente to an end if not dealt with. He revealed that the club had a liability of AR$600 million ($129 million US dollars), debts with former players and managers and various providers and banks.

Campaigns in Primera División went just as poorly as the club's institutional crisis; the team wasn't able to reverse its poor form, and was relegated to the Primera B Nacional division for the first time in its history, after the 2012–13 Primera División. President Javier Cantero resigned a few months later, after a seven-match winless run by the team in Primara B Nacional.

However, soon after that, the influential leader Hugo Moyano took over the club by winning the elections. After being in relegation spots to Primera B Metropolitana for almost two months, the team managed to reverse its form with Omar De Felippe's management and reached and won a promotion play-off against CA Huracán by 2–0 at a single match. Independiente went back to Primera División and, in its first tournament after their return, earned an unexpected fourth place.

Three years later, with Ariel Holan as head coach and international players such as captain Nicolás Tagliafico, Fabricio Bustos, Maximiliano Meza, Alan Franco, Gastón Silva, and Martín Campaña, Independiente reached once again the elite level in Argentine football. They won the 2017 Copa Sudamericana after beating Brazil's popular club Flamengo in the finals.

After the finals, the club sold team captain Nicolás Tagliafico to AFC Ajax for €4.5 million, and youngster Ezequiel Barco to Atlanta United for a transfer fee of $15 million, setting an all-time record transfer for Major League Soccer.

Independiente contested the 2018 Recopa Sudamericana against Copa Libertadores winners Grêmio. Despite the departure of two key players and suffering two early expulsions, the team performed well but finally lost in a penalty shootout.

Later they won the 2018 Suruga Bank Championship, held in Japan, against Cerezo Osaka; and reached the 2018 Copa Libertadores quarterfinals where they lost against eventual champions CA River Plate. At the end of the year, Maximiliano Meza was transferred to CF Monterrey by a $15 million fee.

Kit  and badge

The first shirt worn by the club since its foundation in 1904 was white, with a blue badge on its chest with the acronym "IFC" ("Independiente Football Club"). That badge was inspired on St. Andrew's Athletic Club's. a club established by Scottish descendants that had been the first Primera División champion in 1891.

The traditional red shirt was not worn until 1908, and was inspired on English side Nottingham Forest, which had toured Argentina in 1905. Independiente executives were so impressed by the performance of The Forest that they decide to adopt the red colors for the club. The red shirt debuted on May 10, 1908.

The first badge of the club was also inspired on Saint Andrew's and was used until 1912 when the club switched to a red seal. The logo changed again in 1930, being the closest version of the current emblem. It has been modified (with minor alterations) several times since then.

Stadium 

Independiente's stadium was officially named as "Libertadores de América" in 2005, having been previously known simply as "Estadio de Independiente" or "La Doble Visera de Cemento (The double cement visor") because of the two roofs overhanging the spectators.

The venue was inaugurated on 4 March 1928 in a match against Peñarol of Uruguay. It was the first concrete stadium in South America and would host all international finals Independiente played as local team (7 of the Copa Libertadores, 3 of the Intercontinental Cups, 2 of the Supercopa Sudamericanas and 2 of the Interamericanas Cup) as well as many Argentina international matches, mostly in the 1930s and 1940s.

The Estadio Libertadores de América was closed for repairs in 2007, and reopened on 28 October 2009 in a league match against Colón, which Independiente won 3–2. During construction, Independiente played their home games in four stadiums.

In July 2014, one of the objectives was the completion of the court. Thus it was that, in the 2–1 victory against Racing on August 31 for the fifth date of the Transition Tournament, the "Bochini Alta" grandstand could be seen finished. In May 2015, the construction of "Garganta 3" began and the "Bochini Baja" grandstand was also completed, plus the boxes and also the Press sector. On December 16, 2016 when facing Banfield, Independiente completely inaugurated the "Libertadores de América".

Players

Current squad
.

Out on loan

Individual records

Most appearances

Top scorers

Top-scorers by season
The following tables lists the players that have been named top scorers playing for Independiente in Primera División. Independiente has 15 top scorers.

Previous managers

 Máximo Garay (1936)
 Osvaldo Brandão (1961–63)
 Manuel Giúdice (1963–66)
 Osvaldo Brandão (1967)
 Roberto Ferreiro (1973–74)
 José Pastoriza (1976–79)
 Miguel Ángel Santoro (1980)
 José Pastoriza (1983–84), (1985–87)
 Jorge Solari (1987–89)
 José Pastoriza (1990–91)
 Carlos Fren &  Ricardo Bochini (1991)
 Miguel Ángel Brindisi (1994–95)
 Ricardo Pavoni (1995)
 Gregorio Pérez (1995–96)
 César Luis Menotti (July 1996 – June 97)
 Ricardo Gareca (1997)
 César Luis Menotti (1997–99)
 Enzo Trossero (1999–2000)
 Osvaldo Piazza (2000–2002)
 Miguel Ángel Santoro (2001)
 Néstor Clausen (Jan 2001 – Dec 2001)
 Américo Gallego (2002–2003)
 Oscar Ruggeri (2003)
 Osvaldo Sosa (2003)
 José Pastoriza (2003–2004)
 César Luis Menotti (2004)
 Miguel Ángel Santoro (2005)
 Julio Falcioni (July 2005 – June 2006)
 Jorge Burruchaga (July 2006 – April 2007)
 Pedro Troglio (2007 – 2008)
 M.A. Santoro (interim) (April 2008 – May 2008)
 Claudio Borghi (May 2008 – Oct 2008)
 Miguel Ángel Santoro (Oct 2008 – March 2009)
 Américo Gallego (March 2009 – June 2010)
 César Luis Menotti (July 2009 – Oct 2010)
 Daniel Garnero (July 2010 – Sept 2010)
 Antonio Mohamed (Oct 2010 – Sept 2011)
 Ramón Díaz (Sept 2011 – March 2012)
 Christian Díaz (March 2012 – Aug 2012)
 Américo Gallego (Aug 2012 – April 2013)
 Miguel Ángel Brindisi (April 2013 – Aug 2013)
 Omar De Felippe (Aug 2013 – July 2014)
 Jorge Almirón (July 2014 – May 2015)
 Mauricio Pellegrino (May 2015 – Jun 2016)
 Gabriel Milito (Jun 2016 – Dec 2016)
 Ariel Holan (Jan 2017 – May 2019)
 Sebastián Beccacece (May 2019 - Oct 2019)
 Fernando Berón (Oct 2019 - Dec 2019)
 Lucas Pusineri (Dec 2019 - Jan 2021)
 Fernando Berón (Jan 2021)
 Julio Falcioni (Jan 2021 – Dec 2021)
 Eduardo Domínguez (Jan 2022 – Jul 2022)
 Julio Falcioni (Aug 2022 – Dec 2022)
 Leandro Stillitano (Jan 2023 )

Honours

National

League
Primera División (16): 1922 AAm, 1926 , 1938, 1939, 1948, 1960, 1963, 1967 Nacional, 1970 Metropolitano, 1971 Metropolitano, 1977 Nacional, 1978 Nacional, 1983 Metropolitano, 1988–89, 1994 Clausura, 2002 Apertura

National cups
Copa Ibarguren (2): 1938, 1939
Copa Adrián C. Escobar (1): 1939
Copa de Competencia La Nación (1): 1914
Copa de Competencia Jockey Club (1): 1917
Copa de Honor Municipalidad de Buenos Aires (1): 1918
Copa de Competencia (AAmF) (3): 1924, 1925, 1926

Other cups
 Copa Bullrich (2): 1909, 1917

International
Intercontinental Cup (2): 1973, 1984  
Copa Libertadores (7): 1964, 1965, 1972, 1973, 1974, 1975, 1984 
Copa Sudamericana (2): 2010, 2017 
Recopa Sudamericana (1): 1995 
Suruga Bank Championship (1): 2018 
Copa Interamericana (3): 1972, 1974, 1975 
Supercopa Libertadores (2): 1994, 1995 
Copa Aldao (2): 1938, 1939

Friendlies
 Lunar New Year Cup (1): 1975 
 Torneo Internacional Nocturno (1): 1936 
 Copa Fraternidad (1): 1941 
 Copa Presidente Prado (1): 1941 
 Torneo Cuadrangular de Lisboa (1): 1953
 Torneo Internacional de Chile (1): 1964
 Festa d'Elx Trophy (1): 1967
 Trofeo Montilla Moriles (1): 1967
 Trofeo Villa de Madrid (1): 1981
 Torneo Internacional de Miami (1): 1986
 Copa de las Instituciones (1): 1993
Notes

Notes

References

External links

 

Club Atlético Independiente
i
i
i
i
i
i
Independiente
Independiente
Independiente
I
I